The moonrat (Echinosorex gymnura) is a southeast Asian species of mammal in the family Erinaceidae (hedgehogs and gymnures). It is the only species in the genus Echinosorex. The moonrat is a fairly small, primarily carnivorous animal which, despite its name, is not closely related to rats or other rodents. The scientific name is sometimes given as Echinosorex gymnurus, but this is incorrect.

Description
The moonrat has a distinct pungent odor with strong ammonia content, different from the musky smell of carnivorans. There are two subspecies: E. g. gymnura is found in Sumatra and the Thai-Malay Peninsula; E. g. alba is found in Borneo. In the former the head and frontal half of the body are white or grey-white; the remaining is mainly black. The latter subspecies is generally white (alba means white in Latin), with a sparse scattering of black hairs; it appears totally white from a distance. Those from western Borneo tend to have a greater proportion of black hairs than those from the east, but animals from Brunei appear intermediate. Largely white E. g. gymnura also occur, but they are rare.

Distribution

Moonrats inhabit most jungle terrain in southern Myanmar, Peninsular Thailand, Peninsular Malaysia, Borneo and Sumatra. Although they are closely related to the short-tailed gymnure (Hylomys suillus) and to the hedgehog, full grown specimens more closely resemble large rats, with which they share similar habits and ecological niches. In Borneo, they occur at many sites throughout the lowlands and up to 900 m in the Kelabit Highlands. They appear to be absent or rare in some localities, possibly due to a shortage of suitable food.

Ecology and habitat

Moonrats are nocturnal and terrestrial, lying up under logs, roots or in abandoned burrows during the day. They inhabit moist forests including mangrove and swamp forests and often enter water. In Borneo, they occur mainly in forests, but in peninsular Malaysia they are also found in gardens and plantations. They feed on earthworms and various small animals, mostly arthropods. The moonrat is a host of the acanthocephalan intestinal parasite Moniliformis echinosorexi.

Behaviour and reproduction

Moonrats release strong odours with a strong ammonia content to mark the edges of their territories and warn other moonrats to stay away with threatening hisses also to ward off predators. Adults live alone. When they are preparing to have young, they will make nests mostly from leaves. Females usually have two babies at one time.

Diet

The moonrat is an omnivore, known to eat a wide range of invertebrates—for example, worms, insects, crabs and other invertebrates found in moist areas. They will also eat fruit, and occasionally frogs or fish.

Lifespan

The lifespan of the moonrat is up to five years.

Conservation status

The moonrat is not considered a threatened species. The main threat to the moonrat is deforestation activities due to human development for agriculture, plantation, and commercial logging. Moreover, other demands from Penan in Borneo for food and traditional medicinal contribute to decreasing numbers of moonrats in Borneo. The species is also found in protected areas, including Matang National Park and Kuching Wetlands National Park. Its IUCN status is Least Concern.

Economic importance

The Penan in Borneo used to trade moonrat meat for other foods and goods among themselves and for money.

References

External links

Echinosorex gymnura - Animal Diversity Web

Gymnures
Mammals of Borneo
Mammals of Myanmar
Mammals of Indonesia
Mammals of Malaysia
Mammals of Thailand
Mammals described in 1822